Wellford is an unincorporated community in Kanawha County, in the U.S. state of West Virginia.

History
A post office called Wellford was established in 1889, and remained in operation until 1951. The community most likely was named after the local Wellford family.

References

Unincorporated communities in Kanawha County, West Virginia
Unincorporated communities in West Virginia